Joseph Abbeel (1786 in Vrasene – 1866 in Anzegem) was a Belgian soldier who was conscripted to the French Army of Napoleon Bonaparte. In the position of a carabinier he witnessed the French Invasion of Russia in 1812.

He is one of the few who survived the devastating horror of the raid on Moscow and the chaotic retreat that followed it. He was wounded at the Battle of Borodino. He saw Moscow burn, followed the retreating French Army, but was captured by Cossacks in the vicinity of Hamburg. It was only in 1815 that he came home. He never married. It is assumed that he became a school teacher.

He wrote down his memoirs almost immediately, but never published them. They were rediscovered and edited two centuries later. This, together with Jakob Walter's diary, form the only known records of that campaign kept by common soldiers. Abbeel's story contains some minor historical mistakes, mostly due to his lack of geographical knowledge, but the authenticity of the manuscript is undisputed.

References
 Joost Welten & Johan de Wilde (2011) - Met Napoleon naar Moskou, Davidsfonds - 
 Joseph Abbeel - Mémoires d'un carabinier, Jourdan (2010) -

Notes

1786 births
1866 deaths
Belgian soldiers
French military personnel of the Napoleonic Wars
Napoleonic Wars prisoners of war